Costa Rica competed at the 2015 World Aquatics Championships in Kazan, Russia from 24 July to 9 August 2015.

Open water swimming

Two swimmers from Costa Rica qualified to compete in the open water marathon.

Swimming

Costa Rican swimmers have achieved qualifying standards in the following events (up to a maximum of 2 swimmers in each event at the A-standard entry time, and 1 at the B-standard):

Men

Women

Mixed

Synchronized swimming

Costa Rica fielded a full team of ten synchronized swimmers to compete in each of the following events.

References

External links
FECONA web site

Nations at the 2015 World Aquatics Championships
2015
World Aquatics Championships